Devara Gedda Manava is a 1967 Indian Kannada-language film,  directed by Hunsur Krishnamurthy and produced by Y. V. Rao. The film stars Rajkumar, M. P. Shankar, Narasimharaju and Mikkilineni. The film has musical score by Rajan–Nagendra. Rao and Krishnamurthy shot the movie simultaneously in Telugu as Devuni Gelichina Manavudu starring Kanta Rao.

Cast

Rajkumar
M. P. Shankar
Narasimharaju
Mikkilineni
GVG
Venumadhav
M. S. Ranganath
Guggu
Sambashiva Rao
Modukuri Sathyam
Jayakrishna
Shyamsundar
N. V. Rajavarma
Ganesh
Sarathi
Bheemaraju
Suryanarayana
Seetharam
P. S. Reddy
Raju
Jayanthi
Vijaya Lalitha
Shylashri
Ramadevi
B. Jayashree
Chayadevi
Saraswathi
Renu
Nagini

Soundtrack
The music was composed by Rajan–Nagendra.

References

External links
 
 

1967 films
1960s Kannada-language films
Films scored by Rajan–Nagendra
Films directed by Hunsur Krishnamurthy